Glinkovsky is a rural locality (a khutor) in Saltynskoye Rural Settlement, Uryupinsky District, Volgograd Oblast, Russia. The population was 30 as of 2010. There are 2 streets.

Geography 
Glinkovsky is located in forest steppe, 46 km northwest of Uryupinsk (the district's administrative centre) by road. Pervomaysky is the nearest rural locality.

References 

Rural localities in Uryupinsky District